Carl Alan Kemme (born August 14, 1960) is an American prelate of the Roman Catholic Church.  Since 2014, he has been serving as bishop of the Diocese of Wichita in Kansas.

Early life and education
Carl  Kemme was born on August 14, 1960, in Effingham, Illinois to Donald and Marita (Kortte) Kemme, who ran a farm near Shumway, Illinois.  Carl Kemme has four brothers and one sister.  Kemme attended Shumway Elementary School in Shumway and then Beecher High School in Beecher, Illinois.  After deciding to study for the priesthood, Kemme transferred to St. Henry's Preparatory Seminary in Belleville, Illinois where he finished high school.

After high school, Kemme  enrolled at Immaculate Conception Seminary in Springfield, Illinois.  He later graduated from Cardinal Glennon College in St. Louis and Kenrick Seminary in St. Louis with a Bachelor of Arts degree and a Master of Divinity degree.

Priesthood
Kemme was ordained a priest for the Diocese of Springfield at the Cathedral of the Immaculate Conception by Bishop Daniel L. Ryan on May 10, 1986. After his ordination, Kemme served as parochial vicar in the following parishes in Illinois:

 St. Patrick in Decatur from 1986 to 1989
 Saints Peter and Paul in Collinsville from 1989 to 1990
 Blessed Sacrament in Springfield from 1990 to 1992

From 1992 to 1996, Kemme was named pastor of three parishes in Illinois:

 St. Mary's in Brussels
 St. Joseph in Meppen 
 St. Barbara in Batchtown

Kemme served as the diocesan administrator of Our Lady of the Holy Spirit Parish in Mt. Zion, Illinois from 1996 to 1997. He was then appointed pastor of Holy Family Parish in Decatur, serving there for the next six years.   While still at Holy Family, Kemme was appointed priest moderator of St. James Parish in Decatur for two years.  In 2002, he  was named pastor St. Peter Parish in Petersburg, Illinois, staying there from 2002 to 2005. In 2002, Kemme was named as vicar general and moderator of the curia for the diocese; he would hold both positions until 2009. On August 23, 2002 Pope John Paul II named him a prelate of honor with the title monsignor.  He was assigned as pastor of St. John Vianney Parish in Sherman, Illinois.

In 2009, Kemme resigned as vicar general and moderator to become diocesan administrator sede vacante after the departure of Bishop George Lucas.   With the installation of a new bishop in Springfield, Kemme returned to being vicar general and moderator, remaining in both roles until 2014.

Episcopacy

Bishop of Wichita
On February 20, 2014, Pope Francis appointed Kemme as the eleventh bishop of the Diocese of Wichita. He was consecrated by Archbishop Joseph Naumann on May 1, 2014, in the Cathedral of the Immaculate Conception in Wichita.  Archbishop Lucas  and Bishop Thomas Paprocki were the principal co-consecrators.

On September 20, 2019, Kemme published a list of 15 priests that faced credible accusations of sexual abuse of minors.  Eleven of the priests were deceased and the others were no longer in ministry.  Kemme added this statement:Owning our past is the first step in building a new future, one in which we will continue to diligently work hard as we have been for many years now, so that these violations to human dignity will never happen again.  Many of the faithful will no doubt experience great anger in receiving this information. I share that anger.On November 1, 2021, Kemme placed Michael Schemm, a priest with Resurrection Parish in Bel Aire, Kansas, on suspension pending investigation.  The diocese had received sexual abuse allegations again Schemm dating back to the 1990's.  The diocese also forwarded the allegations to local police.

See also

 Catholic Church hierarchy
 Catholic Church in the United States
 Historical list of the Catholic bishops of the United States
 List of Catholic bishops of the United States
 Lists of patriarchs, archbishops, and bishops

References

External links
Roman Catholic Diocese of Wichita Official Site

Episcopal succession

 

1960 births
Living people
People from Effingham, Illinois
21st-century Roman Catholic bishops in the United States
Roman Catholic Diocese of Springfield in Illinois
Roman Catholic bishops of Wichita
Religious leaders from Illinois
Catholics from Illinois
Bishops appointed by Pope Francis